Carolina Upegui Quevedo (born 16 March 1989) is a Colombian professional racing cyclist, who currently rides for UCI Women's Continental Team . She rode in the women's road race event at the 2020 UCI Road World Championships.

References

External links

1989 births
Living people
Colombian female cyclists
Place of birth missing (living people)
20th-century Colombian women
21st-century Colombian women